A gazetted officer is a police officer in the Sri Lanka Police Service whose name is published in the Police Gazette of Sri Lanka. They are equal to commissioned officers.

Gazetted  officers

gazetted  officers 
Inspector General of Police (IGP)
Senior Deputy Inspector General of Police (SDIG)
Deputy Inspector General of Police (DIG)
Senior Superintendent of Police (SSP)
Superintendent of Police (SP)
Assistant Superintendent of Police (ASP)
Chief Inspector of Police (CI)
Inspector of Police (IP)
Sub Inspector of Police (SI)

External links and references
Issuing of Clearance Certificates

Police ranks of Sri Lanka